Plunderphonics is a music genre in which tracks are constructed by sampling recognizable musical works. The term was coined by composer John Oswald in 1985 in his essay "Plunderphonics, or Audio Piracy as a Compositional Prerogative", and eventually explicitly defined in the liner notes of his Grayfolded album. Plunderphonics can be considered a form of sound collage. Oswald has described it as a referential and self-conscious practice which interrogates notions of originality and identity.

Although the concept of plunderphonics is seemingly broad, in practice there are many common themes used in what is normally called plunderphonic music. This includes heavy sampling of educational films of the 1950s, news reports, radio shows, or anything with trained vocal announcers. Oswald's contributions to this genre rarely used these materials, the exception being his rap-like 1975 track "Power."

The process of sampling other sources is found in various genres (notably hip-hop and especially turntablism), but in plunderphonic works, the sampled material is often the only sound used. These samples are usually uncleared and sometimes result in legal action being taken due to copyright infringement. Some plunderphonic artists use their work to protest what they consider to be overly restrictive copyright laws. Many plunderphonic artists claim their use of other artists' materials falls under the fair use doctrine.

Development of the process is when creative musicians plunder an original track and overlay new material and sounds on top until the original piece is masked and then removed, though often using scales and beats. It is a studio-based technique used by such groups as the American experimental band The Residents (who used Beatles tracks). Often the new track has little resemblance to the original, making it a derivative work and thus freeing the musician from copyright issues.

Early examples
Although the term plunderphonics tends to be applied only to music made since Oswald coined it in the 1980s, there are several examples of earlier music made along similar lines. Notably, Dickie Goodman and Bill Buchanan's 1956 single "The Flying Saucer", features Goodman as a radio reporter covering an alien invasion interspersed with samples from various contemporary records.

According to Chris Cutler, "It wasn’t until 1961 that an unequivocal exposition of plunderphonic techniques arrived in James Tenney’s celebrated Collage No. 1 (‘Blue Suede’), a manipulation of Elvis Presley’s hit record ‘Blue Suede Shoes’. The gauntlet was down; Tenney had picked up a ‘non art,’ lowbrow work and turned it into ‘art’; not as with scored music by writing variations on a popular air, but simply by subjecting a gramophone record to various physical and electrical procedures." According to Oswald, “the difference with ‘Blue Suede’ is how it audaciously used a very recognizable existing recording of another musical work. This blatant appropriation pioneered the discovery, for myself and many others, of an ocean of sampling and plunderphonics in following decades."

The Residents' "Beyond The Valley Of A Day In The Life" consists of excerpts from Beatles records. Various club DJs in the 1970s re-edited the records they played, and although this often consisted of nothing more than extending the record by adding a chorus or two, this too could be considered a form of plunderphonics.

Some classical composers have performed a kind of plunderphonia on written, rather than recorded, music. Perhaps the best-known example is the third movement of Luciano Berio's Sinfonia, which is entirely made up from quotes of other composers and writers. Alfred Schnittke and Mauricio Kagel have also made extensive use of earlier composers' works. Earlier composers who often plundered the music of others include Charles Ives (who often quoted folk songs and hymns in his works) and Ferruccio Busoni (a movement from his 1909 piano suite An die Jugend includes a prelude and a fugue by Johann Sebastian Bach played simultaneously). During the '90s Oswald composed many such scores for classical musicians which he classified with the term Rascali Klepitoire.

In France, Jean-Jacques Birgé has been working on "radiophonies" since 1974 (for his film "La Nuit du Phoque"), capturing radio and editing the samples in real-time with the pause button of a radio-cassette. His group Un Drame Musical Instantané recorded "Crimes parfaits" on LP "A travail égal salaire égal" in 1981, explaining the whole process in the piece itself and calling it "social soundscape". He applied the same technique to TV in 1986 on the "Qui vive?" CD and published on the 1998 CD  "Machiavel" with Antoine Schmitt, an interactive video scratch using 111 very small loops from his own past LPs.

Plunderphonics (EP)
Plunderphonics was used as the title of an EP release by John Oswald. Oswald's original use of the word was to indicate a piece that was created from samples of a single artist and no other material. Influenced by William S. Burroughs' cut-up technique, he began making plunderphonic recordings in the 1970s. In 1988 he distributed copies of the Plunderphonics EP to the press and to radio stations. It contained four tracks: "Pretender" featured a single of Dolly Parton singing "The Great Pretender" progressively slowed down on a Lenco Bogen turntable so that she eventually sounds like a man; "Don't" was Elvis Presley's recording of the titular song overlaid with samples from the recording and overdubs by various musicians, including Bob Wiseman, Bill Frisell and Michael Snow; "Spring" was an edited version of Igor Stravinsky's The Rite of Spring, shuffled around and with different parts played on top of one another; "Pocket" was based on Count Basie's "Corner Pocket," edited so that various parts loop a few times.

Plunderphonic (album)
In 1989 Oswald released a greatly expanded album version of Plunderphonics with twenty-five tracks. As on the EP, each track used material by just one artist. It reworked material by both popular musicians like The Beatles, and classical works such as Ludwig van Beethoven's Symphony No. 7. Like the EP, it was never offered for sale. A central idea behind the record was that the fact that all the sounds were "stolen" should be quite blatant. The packaging listed the sources of all the samples used, but authorization for them to be used on the record was neither sought nor given. All undistributed copies of plunderphonic were destroyed after a threat of legal action from the Canadian Recording Industry Association on behalf of several of their clients (notably Michael Jackson, whose song "Bad" had been chopped into tiny pieces and rearranged as "Dab") who alleged copyright abuses. Various press statements by record industry representatives revealed that a particular item of contention was the album cover art which featured a transformed image of Michael Jackson derived from his Bad cover.

Later works

Oswald was subsequently approached by Phil Lesh to use Grateful Dead material on what became the Grayfolded album.

Later works by Oswald, such as Plexure, which lasts just twenty minutes but is claimed to contain around one thousand very short samples of pop music stitched together, are not strictly speaking "plunderphonic" according to Oswald's original conception (he himself used the term megaplundermorphonemiclonic for Plexure), but the term "plunderphonic" is used today in a looser sense to indicate any music completely — or almost completely — made up of samples. Plunderphonics 69/96 is a compilation of Oswald's work, including tracks from the original plunderphonic CD.

It is often assumed that "plunderphonics" is a brand name that Oswald applies exclusively to his recordings, but he has stated several times that he considers the term to describe a genre of music, with many exponents.

Works by other artists
Another important early purveyor of what can be described as plunderphonics was the Houston, Texas based industrial punk rock band, Culturcide’s second album entitled “Tacky Souvenirs Of Pre-Revolutionary America” (released in 1986) where the band sampled famous 1980’s Top 40 pop and rock songs. Negativland (See Negativland's "Fair Use: The Story of the Letter U and the Numeral 2") is another important work that utilizes plunderphonics. While Oswald and Culturcide used easily recognizable and familiar sources, Negativland's sources were sometimes more obscure. 1983's A Big 10-8 Place, for instance, consists of recordings of people talking on the radio. Their next album, Escape From Noise, like most of their later records, also makes extensive use of spoken-word samples, often to make particular political points. Their most famous release, the U2 EP, featured an extended rant from radio DJ Casey Kasem and extensively sampled U2's "I Still Haven't Found What I'm Looking For", which resulted in a lawsuit being brought by U2's label, Island Records.

Both Oswald and Negativland made their recordings by cutting up magnetic tape (or later using digital technology), but several DJs have also produced plunderphonic works using turntables; in fact, "digging" for samples plays a large part in DJ culture. Christian Marclay is a turntablist who has been using other people's records as the sole source of his music-making since the late 1970s. He often treats the records in unusual ways, for example, he has physically cut up a group of records and stuck them together, making both a visual and aural collage. Sometimes several spoken-word or lounge music records bought from thrift stores are mashed together to make a Marclay track, but his More Encores album cuts up tracks by the likes of Maria Callas and Louis Armstrong in a way similar to Oswald's work on Plunderphonics. Marclay's experimental approach has been taken up by the likes of Roberto Musci & Giovanni Venosta, Otomo Yoshihide, Philip Jeck and Martin Tétreault, although in these artist's works the records used are sometimes heavily disguised and unrecognizable.

The Bran Flakes and People Like Us have both used thrift store records to create their music; the Canadian pop band TAS 1000 did the same with thrift store answering machine tapes. Late 80's house musicians like Coldcut, S'Express, MARRS used cut-up collages to build dance music songs. Kid 606 has created quite a bit of plunderphonic work (most notably "The Action-Packed Mentalist Bring You the Fucking Jams"), similarly never seeking permission, although his work is sold commercially. Akufen used more than 2000 plundered sound samples to build his My Way album. Wobbly is also known for his plunderphonic works, most notably "Wild Why", a CD piece compiled from his own recordings of mainstream Hip-Hop radio from the San Francisco Bay Area. In Italy Filippo Paolini (aka Økapi) has published several albums using samples also for post-classical music projects.

Vicki Bennett of People Like Us has extended the plunderphonic ideal to video, creating films to accompany her music by plundering the resources of the Prelinger Archives, the online part of the collection of film archivist Rick Prelinger. Anne McGuire used similar techniques in her 1992 film Strain Andromeda The. With permission, McGuire reversed The Andromeda Strain shot by shot so that everything unfolded in reverse order, although with each scene running in normal time with comprehensible dialogue.

Andrea Rocca’s 1994 album Heartsounds, and much of his subsequent output, makes extensive use of plunderphonics, with dialogue and musical fragments taken from sources as diverse as cartoons and pornography.

Another approach is to take two very different records and play them simultaneously. An early example of this is the Evolution Control Committee's Whipped Cream Mixes (1994), which laid the vocals from Public Enemy's "Rebel Without a Pause" over Herb Alpert's "Bittersweet Samba". This gave rise to the so-called "bastard pop" or "mash-up" phenomenon where an a cappella version of one song is mixed on top of a purely instrumental version of another song. Soulwax and Richard X have both produced records along these lines.

New possibilities in plunderphonics projects are permitted by Dataflow programming languages, such as Pure Data and Max/Msp, allowing the artist to even release true aleatory works, which will sound different each time the listener executes the algorithm, an example of this approach is the work of Alea T. - Hot 01-00-09.

There are also several Web-based plunderphonics projects. The Droplift Project created a compilation CD of plunderphonic works which was then "drop lifted" into record stores (this involved slipping copies of the record onto the shelves without knowledge of the store owner — a sort of reverse stealing). Dictionaraoke took audio clips from online dictionaries and stitched them together so that they recited the words of various popular songs while instrumental versions of the music (often in MIDI renderings) played along. Vaporwave, which largely consists of sampled and slowed down 1980s pop music, has been cited as a subgenre of plunderphonics. American musician and humorist Neil Cicierega has released several mashup albums with a plunderphonic ethos, beginning with his albums Mouth Sounds and Mouth Silence, both released in 2014 on his own website, which were released to critical acclaim.

Notes

External links

 Interview with John Oswald (2010) for Ràdio Web MACBA 
 Radio Feature The Some Assembly Required Interview with John Oswald (2001)
 "Plunderphonics, or Audio Piracy as a Compositional Prerogative" – an essay by John Oswald
 plunderphonics.com – website created by Oswald cohort Phil Strong
 pfony.com – Oswald's record label: includes some current info on his other activities
 ccutler.co.za A comprehensive history and analysis of plunderphonia by Chris Cutler.
 detritus.net – deals with recycled art in all areas, especially music
 Illegal Art
 We Edit Life (Vicki Bennett's Movie)
 Variations A series on Sampling Music by Jon Leidecker for Ràdio Web MACBA

Musical techniques
Sampling (music)
Electronic music genres